Itumeleng Robinson Moshobane (born 17 September 1994), known as Tumi Moshobane, is a South African soccer player who plays as a midfielder for San Diego Loyal in the USL Championship.

Career

College
On 31 August 2015, Moshobane debuted for NJCAA side Kankakee Cavaliers. In 2016, he moved to Olivet Nazarene University. Having been redshirted for the 2016 NAIA season, he earned honourable mentions for the 2017 and 2018 NAIA Men's Soccer All-America teams.

References

External links
 
 Tumi Moshobane at Olivet Nazarene University

1994 births
Living people
South African soccer players
South African expatriate soccer players
Association football midfielders
Charlotte Eagles players
Lansing Ignite FC players
USL League One players
USL League Two players
San Diego Loyal SC players
South African expatriate sportspeople in the United States
Expatriate soccer players in the United States
Olivet Nazarene Tigers men's soccer players
Junior college men's soccer players in the United States
Kaizer Chiefs F.C. players
National Premier Soccer League players